Zdzisław Lesiński (19 September 1921 – 22 August 2000) was a Polish gymnast. He competed in eight events at the 1952 Summer Olympics.

References

1921 births
2000 deaths
Polish male artistic gymnasts
Olympic gymnasts of Poland
Gymnasts at the 1952 Summer Olympics
Sportspeople from Poznań